Lists of Commissioners' churches are lists of Anglican churches built in Britain with money voted by Parliament of the United Kingdom as a result of the Church Building Act 1818, and subsequent related Acts. The lists are organized by region.

Lists by region
List of Commissioners' churches in London
List of Commissioners' churches in southwest England
List of Commissioners' churches in eastern England
List of Commissioners' churches in the English Midlands
List of Commissioners' churches in Northeast and Northwest England
List of Commissioners' churches in Yorkshire
List of Commissioners' churches in Wales